is a Japanese film director. He joined Nikkatsu studio and worked as an assistant director under Toshio Masuda. He made his director debut in 1968 with "Outlaw: Gangster VIP 2". Including the Outlaw series, Tetsuya Watari appeared in most of the films he directed when he was a director of Nikkatsu company.

Selected filmography

Film
 Outlaw: Gangster VIP 2 (1968)
 Outlaw: Heartless (1968)
 Outlaw: Goro the Assassin (1968)
 Outlaw: Black Dagger (1968)
 Big Boss: Outlaw (1968) 
  Profile of a Boss' Son (1970)
  Swirling Butterflies (1970) 
 Pay off Your Debt!  (1970)
 Earth Ninja Chronicles: Duel in the Wind or Doninki kazeno tengu (1970)
 Kantō Exile (1971) 
 Tekkihei, Tonda (1980)

Television
Taiyō ni Hoero! (1972–78)
Daitokai Series (1976–79) 
Daitsuiseki (1978) (ep.23 and 24)
Tantei Monogatari series (1979–80) (ep.17, 18, 24 and 25)
Seibu Keisatsu series (1979–84)
''Pro Hunter (1981) (ep.5 and 6)

References

1933 births
Living people
People from Kagoshima Prefecture
Japanese film directors
Yakuza film directors